Town Planning Code of Russia is a legislative act of the Russia  dedicated to: 
engineering of building
town planning
 territorial planning
 sustainable development of territories
 regulations forzones with special use conditions
 land use and development rules
 rules for self-regulatory organizations in the field of engineering studies, architectural and construction design, construction, reconstruction, repair of capital construction projects
regulate of making of programs of integrated development of communal settlement infrastructure systems, urban Region
  powers of the state authorities of the Russian Federation in the field of town-planning activity

Town Planning Code was accepted the State Duma in 2004.

References

Law of Russia
Russia
Standards of Russia